The Abbott and Costello Show is a comedy program from the era of old-time radio in the United States. It was broadcast first on NBC and later on ABC, beginning on July 3, 1940 and ending on June 9, 1949.

Format
Film stars Bud Abbott and Lou Costello adapted their talents to radio for the 30-minute weekly comedy program. Vincent Terrace, in his book, Radio Programs, 1924-1984: A Catalog of More Than 1800 Shows, wrote, "Many of the skits revolved around Bud and Lou's efforts to succeed in some sort of business venture." The sketches were often culled from their vaudeville act.

Abbott and Costello became one of the top radio comedy acts of the 1940s.

Personnel
Supporting players included Joe Kirk (Costello's brother-in-law) as the excitable Sicilian immigrant Mr. Bacciagalupe, Artie Auerbach as Mr. Kitzel, Elvia Allman, Iris Adrian, Mel Blanc, Wally Brown, John Brown, Sharon Douglas, Verna Felton, Sidney Fields, Frank Nelson, Kent Rogers, Lionel Stander, Martha Wentworth and Benay Venuta. Guest stars included Cary Grant, Frank Sinatra, the Andrews Sisters and Lucille Ball.

Singers appearing on the show included Amy Arnell, Connie Haines, Marilyn Maxwell, Susan Miller and Marilyn Williams. The vocal groups were the Delta Rhythm Boys and the Les Baxter Singers. Orchestra leaders were Skinnay Ennis, Charles Hoff, Matty Matlock, Jack Meakin, Will Osborne, Freddie Rich, Leith Stevens and Peter van Steeden.

Schedule
Abbott and Costello debuted on radio on Kate Smith's program in 1938. They continued performing on the show until the summer of 1940. Their first program of their own was a summer replacement for The Fred Allen Show in 1940. After a hiatus of two years, the show returned as a regular network program in the fall of 1942 and ran through the spring of 1949.

Beginning in 1947, the programs were recorded and made available via transcriptions to stations outside of the regular ABC network.

A related program, The Abbott and Costello Children's Show, was broadcast on ABC beginning December 6, 1947 and ending March 26, 1949. It was sustaining and featured child performers and included quizzes and games.

See also
 The Fred Allen Show
 The Jack Benny Program
 The Martin and Lewis Show
 The Pepsodent Show

References 

1940s American radio programs
1940 radio programme debuts
1949 radio programme endings
ABC radio programs
NBC radio programs
American comedy radio programs